Xincheng may refer to:

People
Tuoba Xincheng (拓拔新成), brother of Emperor Wencheng of Northern Wei; held the title of Prince You of Yangping
Xincheng, one of the daughters of Emperor Taizong of Tang (Li Shimin) and Empress Zhangsun

Places

Mainland China
Xincheng County (忻城县), of Laibin, Guangxi
Xincheng District (新城区)
Xincheng District, Hohhot, Inner Mongolia
Xincheng District, Xi'an, Shaanxi
Xincheng Air Base and Yinchuan/Xincheng Air Base, both in the Lanzhou Military Region of the PRC
Xincheng, one of the nine commanderies of the Protectorate General to Pacify the East
Xincheng Prison in Beijing
 Xincheng Town (disambiguation)
 Xincheng Township (disambiguation) (新城乡)
 Xincheng Subdistrict (disambiguation)

Taiwan
Xincheng, Hualien (新城鄉), township in Hualien City, Republic of China (Taiwan)
Xincheng Incident, during the Japanese occupation

Art forms
Xincheng Opera, a traditional form of Chinese theater from northeast China

See also
 Xingcheng, a town in Liaoning province, China